Sutphin Boulevard is a major street in the New York City borough of Queens, Its northern end is at Hillside Avenue in Jamaica and its southern end is Rockaway Boulevard on the border of South Jamaica and Springfield Gardens. It comes from the Dutch name Sutphin, which is derived from the Dutch city of Zutphen.

Route description 
Sutphin Boulevard begins at Hillside Avenue and passes through Jamaica Center. Between Archer Avenue and 94th Avenue, Sutphin Boulevard goes under the tracks of the Long Island Rail Road at Jamaica station. It passes through the Jamaica and South Jamaica neighborhoods. Major intersections along the way include Liberty Avenue, Lakewood Avenue, Linden Boulevard and Foch Boulevard. Sutphin Boulevard ends at the intersection of Rockaway Boulevard and 150th Street; south of that intersection, 150th Street continues into John F. Kennedy International Airport.

Transportation 
Sutphin Boulevard passes by several New York City Subway stations named for it along the way, including:
, on the IND Queens Boulevard Line at Hillside Avenue, serving the 
, a station complex on the Archer Avenue lines, serving the 
, the former BMT Jamaica Line elevated station at Jamaica Avenue; now demolished and replaced by the Archer Avenue station

Several bus routes run along Sutphin Boulevard in Jamaica. The  run on Sutphin Boulevard between Hillside Avenue and Archer Avenue. The  buses all serve portions of Sutphin Boulevard south of Downtown Jamaica, while the Q7 serves the route. In addition, the  buses all terminate on Sutphin Boulevard.

References 

Streets in Queens, New York
Jamaica, Queens